Naandri, Meendum Varuga is a 1982 Indian Tamil-language film starring Pratap Pothen and Suhasini, with Jaishankar in a significant role. Lot of actors and directors made guest appearances in the film, including Rajinikanth, Jayachitra, Raadhika, Poornima Jayaram, Charuhasan, Thengai Srinivasan and Silk Smitha. The film was released on 9 July 1982.

Plot

Cast 
Pratap Pothen
Suhasini

Guest appearances
Rajinikanth
Jaishankar
Jayachitra
Raadhika
Poornima Jayaram
Aruna
Silk Smitha
Vanitha Krishnachandran
Thengai Srinivasan
Charuhasan
Raveendran
I. V. Sasi
Visu
Mathioli Shanmugham

Soundtrack 
Soundtrack was composed by Shyam.

Reception 
Writing for Sunday Mid-Day, S. Shivakumar panned the film: "The film has all necessary ingredients from Smitha to the lead pair dying in the end. But a bad film remains bad and even a guest appearance by [Rajinikanth] hasn't helped this film at the box-office".

References

External links 
 

1980s Tamil-language films
1982 films
Films directed by T. S. B. K. Moulee
Films scored by Shyam (composer)